The Independent Bosnian-Herzegovinian List (Bosnian: Nezavisna bosanskohercegovačka lista) (NBL) was a political party in Bosnia and Herzegovina based in Sarajevo. The party was created by a group of mayors who were elected in the 2016 Bosnian local elections.

The NBL merged with the Party of Democratic Activity (A-SDA) on 27 February 2021 to create a new party named the People's European Union of Bosnia and Herzegovina (NES). The two parties were dissolved, and the new party became the ruling party in Una-Sana canton. Prior to its dissolution, the party was led by Ibrahim Hadžibajrić.

See also 

 List of political parties in Bosnia and Herzegovina
 People's European Union of Bosnia and Herzegovina
 Party of Democratic Activity

References

External links 

 Official site
Conservatism
Political parties established in 2017
Political parties in Bosnia and Herzegovina